House at 103 Roslyn Avenue is a historic home located at Sea Cliff in Nassau County, New York.  It was built in 1884 and is a two-story, clapboard-sided residence with a cross-gable, slate-covered roof in the Queen Anne style. It features a three-story square tower with a pyramidal roof and a "wraparound shed roof" porch.  It includes "three decorative corbelled chimneys".

It was listed on the National Register of Historic Places in 1988 as "House at 103 Rosyln Avenue".

It was included in a study covering the Sea Cliff Summer Resort area as a "Thematic Group".

References

Houses on the National Register of Historic Places in New York (state)
Queen Anne architecture in New York (state)
Houses completed in 1884
Houses in Nassau County, New York
National Register of Historic Places in Nassau County, New York